The Rutu Estate is a Residential Complex located at Patlipada, Ghodbunder Road, Maharashtra state in India. It is a located under Thane city. Official Residence of Thane Municipal Commissioner located right opposite to the rutu estate complex & Hiranandani Estate is Situated close by, Shree Maa School is just 2 mins away from the complex.

Introduction
The Rutu Estate is a 3rd Residential Complex on the Ghodbunder Road, after Rutu Park and Rutu Enclave built by the Rutu Developers. Rutu Estate, however, is on a much larger scale as compared to the Other Rutu Residential Complex. The Rutu Estate has a Towers section which is being missing in the other Rutu Complexes.

Residential towers from 7 storeys to 18 storeys form the spectacular skyline in the area. The complex offers a wide choice of one, two, two & half, three bedroom luxury apartments.

Residential Complex

Residential Buildings have been named as the Alphabets

Shopping Centre
Dhanlaxmi Complex is the Commercial Section of The Rutu Estate and Rutu Towers, i.e. the only Shopping Center, many General store, fast food center, ATM, Medical Shop, Internet Cafe, Barber Shop, Fitness Gym and a Hospital is located inside this Commercial Complex.

Domino's Pizza is located in Dhanlaxmi Complex along with YES Bank ATM.

List of Amenities
 Club House (with gymnasium, table tennis, etc.)
 Swimming Pool
 Lush greenery with Gardens and Play Grounds

Accessibility
The Complex is just 30 minutes (6 km) away from Thane Railway station. Mulund Railway station is also quite close which is 35 - 40 mins (9 km) away.  Through Ghodbunder Road with quick access to Borivali /Mira Road, the Western Suburb.

Other attractions
The other Important place which is not located inside the Complex are

Education Center
 Close proximity to Sri Ma Vidyalaya (SSC/CBSE Board) school
 Hiranandani Foundation School (Kindergarten to 12th standard with ICSE syllabus), Millennium Pre-School & The Reading Tree- Pre Primary School is located inside Hiranandani Estate.

Banks & ATMs
 State Bank of India
 Axis Bank (UTI Bank) & ATM
 Indian Bank & ATM
 Kotak Mahindra Bank
 Andhra Bank & ATM
 HDFC Bank ATM
 ICICI Bank

Most Prominent commercial stores
 Godrej Nature's Basket - Grocery Store, Spencer's Supermarket, Spinach - Grocery Store, etc. Situated close by in neighbouring Hiranandani Estate
 Vijay Sales & Mi (Kapurbavadi) - 10 mins away
 More Store (Lawkim) - 5 mins away
 Reebok Store - 5 mins away

Cinema Halls & Eatry
 R- Mall (Lawkim) - 5 mins away
 CineMax: Wonder Mall (Kapurbavadi) - 10 mins away
 Baskin Robins, Naturals Ice Cream, Cafe Coffee Day, Spice Up Pure Veg. Restaurant, etc. Situated close by in neighbouring Hiranandani Estate
 Pizza Hut Located inside Wonder Mall
 McDonalds
Water Park & Amusement Park
 Suraj Water park (Waghbil) - 5 mins away
 Tiku jini wadi (Kokanipada) - 10 mins away

Worship Place
 Shree Ganesh Temple near Hiranandani Gate.
 Ekvira mata Temple (Gaondevi) [Village Goddess] opposite TMC Commissioner Bungalow
 Shiv Mandir in Patlipada Village
 Church is located at Lawkim and Majiwada (i.e. 5 & 10 mins away resp)
 Masjid at Kasarwadavli and Kapurbawadi

See also

 Brahmand
 Hiranandani Estate
 Kaasar Vadavali
 Pachpakhadi
 Patlipada
 Thane
 Thane Municipal Transport (TMT)
 Transportation in Thane
 Waghbil

References

Neighbourhoods in Thane